Stan Smith was the defending champion, but lost in the quarterfinals this year.

Jimmy Connors won the title, defeating John Paish 6–2, 6–3 in the final.

Draw

Finals

Top half

Section 1

Section 2

Bottom half

Section 3

Section 4

External links
 Main draw

1972 Queen's Club Championships